Marine clay is a type of clay found in coastal regions around the world.  In the northern, deglaciated regions, it can sometimes be quick clay, which is notorious for being involved in landslides.

Marine clay is a particle of soil that is dedicated to a particle size class, this is usually associated with USDA's classification with sand at 0.05mm, silt at 0.05-.002mm and clay being less than 0.002 mm in diameter. Paired with the fact this size of particle was deposited within a marine system involving the erosion and transportation of the clay into the ocean.

Soil particles become suspended when in a solution with water, with sand being affected by the force of gravity first with suspended silt and clay still floating in solution. This is also known as turbidity, in which floating soil particles create a murky brown color to a water solution. These clay particles are then transferred to the abyssal plain in which they are deposited in high percentages of clay. 

Once the clay is deposited on the ocean floor it can change its structure through a process known as flocculation, process by which fine particulates are caused to clump together or floc.  These can be either edge to edge flocculation or edge to face flocculation. Relating to individual clay particles interacting with each other. Clays can also be aggregated or shifted in their structure besides being flocculated.

Particles configurations 
Clay particles can self-assemble into various configurations, each with totally different properties.

This change in structure to the clay particles is due to a swap in cations with the basic structure of a clay particle. This basic structure of the clay particle is known as a silica tetrahedral or aluminum octahedral. They are the basic structure of clay particles composing of one cation, usually silica or aluminum surrounded by hydroxide anions, these particles form in sheets forming what we know as clay particles and have very specific properties to them including micro porosity which is the ability of clay to hold water against the force of gravity, shrink swell capacity and absorption capabilities.

When clay is deposited in the ocean, the presence of excess ions in seawater causes a loose, open structure of the clay particles to form, a process known as flocculation. Once stranded and dried by ancient changing ocean levels, this open framework means that such clay is open to water infiltration.  Construction in marine clays thus presents a geotechnical engineering challenge.

Where clay overlies peat, a lateral movement of the coastline is indicated and shows a rise in relative sea level

Effect on building foundations
Swelling of marine clay has the potential to destroy building foundations in only a few years.  Due to the changes in climatic conditions on the construction site, the pavement constructed on the marine clay (as subgrade) will have less durability and requires lot of maintenance cost.  Some simple precautions, however, can reduce the hazard significantly .

The swapping of this positive cation with another is what makes different types of clays including Kaolinite, montmorillonite, smectite and illite. This happens in marine clays because the ocean's water is high in solution with cations making it very easy to overcome the clays negative net charge and swap the clays cation with a less positive one. These marine clays can be what are known as quick clays, which are notorious for its erosive properties. A great example of these quick clays is in the pacific northwest. They are known as blue goo which is a mix of clay and mélange (greenstone, basalt, chert, shale, sandstone, schists. uplifted through the accretionary wedge). These quick clays have a very high-risk factor associated with them if they are built upon, as they are very unstable due to the fact that liquefaction happens when it becomes saturated and literally flows, causing mass wasting events to happen. Other marine clays are used all around the world for many different uses, such as ceramics, building material, including adobe. Clay layers in soils which can be used as an impermeable layer are very important for dumps or chemical spills as they have a very high absorption capacity for heavy metals. For these clays to be available for human use they must have been eroded, deposited on the ocean floor and then uplifted through means of tectonic activity to bring it to land.

During the construction of Marina Barrage in Singapore, marine clay was found at the site. Since marine clay was the cause of the Nicoll Highway collapse years previous, the construction team removed all the marine clay to ensure the stability of Marina Barrage.  Later on, they found marine clay mixed with seawater even in the deeper underground.

Geotechnical problems posed by marine clay can be handled by various ground improvement techniques.  Marine clay can be densified by mixing it with cement or similar binding material in specific proportions.  Marine clay can be stabilised using wastes of various industries like porcelain industry and tree-cutting industries.  This method is usually adopted in highways where marine clay is used as a subgrade soil.

References

Bibliography 
 ̈Effect of pore water chemistry on the hydro-mechanical behaviour of Lianyungang soft marine clay- Deng, Y.F. ; Yue, X.B. ; Cui, Y.J. ; Shao, G.H. ; Liu, S.Y. ; Zhang, D.W. Applied Clay Science, June 2014, Vol.95, pp. 167–175
 
 ̈Strength of High Water Content Marine Clay Stabilized by Low Amount of Cement; Zhang, R ; Santoso, A ; Tan, T ; Phoon, Kː Journal of Geotechnical and Geoenvironmental Engineering, April 23, 2013

 Structuration and Destructuration Behavior of Cement-Treated Singapore Marine Clay; Kamruzzaman, A ; Chew, S ; Lee, F; Journal of Geotechnical Engineering, Apr. 2009, Issue 4, pp. 573–589

 Sulfidization of lacustrine glacial clay upon Holocene marine transgression (Arkona Basin, Baltic Sea); Holmkvist, Lars ; Kamyshny, Alexey ; Brüchert, Volker ; Ferdelman, Timothy G. ; Jørgensen, Bo Barker; Geochimica et Cosmochimica Acta, 1 October 2014, Vol.142, pp. 75–94

 Linear and Nonlinear Dynamic Response of Piles in Soft Marine Clay; Dezi, Francesca ; Gara, Fabrizio ; Roia, Davide; Journal of Geotechnical and Geoenvironmental Engineering, July 29, 2016, Vol.143(1)

Oceanography
Sediments